Odani may refer to:

Misako Odani (born 1976), Japanese singer, songwriter, and pianist
Odani Castle, a castle in Kohoku in Shiga Prefecture, Japan

See also
Siege of Odani Castle, the last stand of the Azai clan in 1573